Quirizio di Giovanni da Murano or Quirizio da Murano or Quiricius (Venice  ), was an Italian Renaissance painter of religious subjects.

Biography
Little is known about this painter. He is supposed to have been a pupil of Antonio of Murano, though conjectures by critics vary about him and his work.

The probability is that he did little alone, but was one of the assistants in the Vivarini workshop.

His use of tempera is similar to the school of Murano, flat, light, and with little or no shade. His type of head is regular and well-shaped, fingers and neck long, waist very slender.

Works

 The Savior / Christ Showing His Wounds and the Host to a Clarissan Nun (1460–1478) : The painting was made for the monastery of Saint Clare on Murano island and shows a rather feminine Christ holding his wounded breast. Now in the Academia in Venice, painting  tempera and oil on panel.

  (Venice) (tempera)
  (1461–1478) (triptych of Madonna of humility, with Saint Augustine and Saint Jerome on the left, and Saint Catherine and Saint Lucie on the right and The Virgin Adoring the Child in the center

Some of other works attributed to him may have been done by Bartolommeo Vivarini.

References

External links

 Painting from Quirizio
 Explanations on the Santa Lucia
 Details on the Christ
 More on School of Murano

Painters from Venice
15th-century Italian painters
Italian male painters
Italian Renaissance painters
Year of death unknown
Year of birth unknown